Stefano Salvi (born 2 January 1987) is an Italian professional footballer who plays as a midfielder for Serie D club Martina.

Club career
Formed in Lazio and Internazionale's youth systems, Salvi started his senior career in Serie D club Città di Jesolo.

On 2007 he joined Como, and made his professional debut for Serie C1 on 23 August 2009 against Monza.

On 2 August 2019, he signed for Foggia.

On 21 July 2021, he joined Legnago Salus.

References

External links
 
 

1987 births
Living people
Footballers from Rome
Italian footballers
Association football midfielders
Serie C players
Serie D players
S.S. Lazio players
Inter Milan players
U.S. Città di Jesolo players
U.S. Sassuolo Calcio players
Como 1907 players
S.S.D. Sanremese Calcio players
Treviso F.B.C. 1993 players
A.S.D. Sorrento players
U.S. Lecce players
S.S. Juve Stabia players
Bassano Virtus 55 S.T. players
L.R. Vicenza players
Calcio Foggia 1920 players
F.C. Legnago Salus players
A.S.D. Martina Calcio 1947 players